Michael Peart is a former Irish judge who served as a Judge of the Court of Appeal from 2014 to 2019 and a Judge of the High Court from 2002 to 2014.

Early life 
Peart attended Glenstal Abbey and obtained a BCL degree from University College Dublin. Following his education at the Law Society of Ireland, he was admitted as a solicitor in 1970. He worked at Pearts Solicitors with a speciality in litigation. He represented Bula Mines in litigation against Tara Mine which frequently reached the Supreme Court of Ireland. He is a bencher of the King's Inns.

Judicial career
He was appointed to the High Court in 2002. He was the first Solicitor appointed to the High Court. He presided over cases in the High Court involving criminal law, judicial review, personal injuries, immigration law and commercial law.

Peart became a Judge of the Court of Appeal in October 2014 upon its establishment. In the Court of Appeal, he delivered judgments on appeals involving defamation, judicial review, land law, criminal law, discovery, and professional misconduct. He chaired a committee to reform legal education of solicitors in Ireland through the Law Society of Ireland, which presented its findings in 2018. He retired in October 2019 in advance of his seventieth birthday.

References

Living people
20th-century Irish lawyers
Alumni of University College Dublin
Judges of the Court of Appeal (Ireland)
High Court judges (Ireland)
Year of birth missing (living people)